Black Sheep is a rarities album by American alternative metal band Ra, being their fifth release total, including their live album. It includes a collection of B-sides and demos that go back to 1994. Ra's newest single "Supernova" is featured on the album; "Supernova" was digitally released on June 9, 2009. Black Sheep was digitally released on iTunes, but was never released for physical purchasing in retail stores.

The only previously released song is "Crazy Little Voices". It was originally released in 1999 as part of The Rage: Carrie 2 Original Motion Picture Soundtrack. Rapping is prevalent in the album, especially in the songs "The Foundation", "Busted", "Chained to the Ground", and "Deliverance". The album's most straight-up, heavy metal song is "Baghdad"; this song is similar to "Parole" from Ra's debut album, From One. In the outro of "Chained to the Ground", the musicians play a part of Black Sabbath's "War Pigs".

Track listing

References

External links
Liner notes and personal message

Ra (American band) albums
2009 compilation albums